Tom Sawyer Abroad is a novel by Mark Twain published in 1894. It features Tom Sawyer and Huckleberry Finn in a parody of adventure stories like those of Jules Verne.

Plot
In the story, Tom, Huck, and Jim travel to Africa in a futuristic hot air balloon, where they survive encounters with lions, robbers, and fleas to see some of the world's greatest wonders, including the Pyramids and the Sphinx. Like Adventures of Huckleberry Finn and Tom Sawyer, Detective, the story is told using the first-person narrative voice of Huck Finn. It is a sequel, set in the time following the title story of the Tom Sawyer series.

See also

Mark Twain bibliography
List of characters in the Tom Sawyer series
Five Weeks in a Balloon by Jules Verne

Notes

External links
 
 Tom Sawyer Abroad / Tom Sawyer, Detective, University of California Press, 2004.
 

Novels by Mark Twain
1894 American novels
American adventure novels
Novels set in Africa
Aviation novels
1890s children's books